Ahmed Mohammed Mubarak Al Mahri (Arabic: أحمد محمد مبارك المهري) also known as Dada (دادا) or Ahmed Muhad (أحمد محاد). His full name is Ahmad Muhammad Mubarak Muhad al-Mahry (أحمد محمد مبارك محاد المهري)(born 10 June 1988) is a United Arab Emirati footballer who currently plays as a midfielder.

He played 11 matches during the 2010 FIFA World Cup qualification (AFC), and scored 1 goal against Vietnam.

Name
His name, Ahmed Mohammed Mubarak Al Mahri, means Ahmed, Son of Mohammed, son of Mubarak, descendant of Al Mahri. He is sometimes refer as Ahmed Mohammed, Ahmed Mohammed Mubarak or just Ahmed, but he is not Mr.Mohammed nor Mr.Mubarak. He is Mr.Al Mahri.

Ahmed Mohammed also spelled as Ahmad Muhammad.

External links
Profile at Al-Jazira
Profile at Al-Jazira Forum

Emirati footballers
United Arab Emirates international footballers
Association football midfielders
People from Abu Dhabi
1988 births
Living people
Al Jazira Club players
Baniyas Club players
Khor Fakkan Sports Club players
UAE First Division League players
UAE Pro League players
2007 AFC Asian Cup players